Oliver Harry Hayes-Brown (born 28 April 2000) is an Australian professional basketball player for the Perth Wildcats of the National Basketball League (NBL). He played one season of college basketball for the UC Riverside Highlanders.

Early life and career
Hayes-Brown grew up in Melbourne, Victoria, where he attended Peninsula Grammar. He played for the Dandenong Rangers as a junior and was a member of an Australian U19 national team.

Hayes-Brown debuted in the semi-pro SEABL in 2017 with the Frankston Blues. He continued on in the SEABL in 2018 with the Dandenong Rangers, and then played for the Rangers in 2019 in the inaugural NBL1 season.

College career
After redshirting the 2019–20 season, Hayes-Brown made his college basketball debut for the UC Riverside Highlanders in the 2020–21 season. In 20 games, he averaged 3.2 points and 3.6 rebounds per game.

Professional career
After returning to Australia, Hayes-Brown played for the Dandenong Rangers in the 2021 NBL1 South season, where he averaged 19.6 points and 13.3 rebounds in 12 games.

In October 2021, Hayes-Brown signed with the Perth Wildcats of the National Basketball League (NBL) as a development player for two seasons. In the 2021–22 NBL season, he totalled eight points and twelve rebounds in eight games.

For the 2022 NBL1 West season, Hayes-Brown joined the Willetton Tigers. In seven games, he averaged 23.0 points, 15.1 rebounds, 2.1 assists and 1.4 steals per game.

Hayes-Brown re-joined the Wildcats for the 2022–23 NBL season as a development player. He is set to join the Keilor Thunder for the 2023 NBL1 South season.

References

External links
NBL1 profile
NBL profile
UC Riverside Highlanders bio

2000 births
Living people
Australian men's basketball players
Australian expatriate basketball people in the United States
Basketball players from Melbourne
Centers (basketball)
Perth Wildcats players
UC Riverside Highlanders men's basketball players